Len Ikitau (born 1 October 1998) is an Australian professional rugby union player. He plays as a centre for the Brumbies in Super Rugby and has represented  in international rugby. Ikitau signed for the Brumbies squad in 2019.

Ikitau made his debut for Australia in the second game of the 2021 France rugby union tour of Australia, coming off the bench in a 26-28 loss in Melbourne.

International Tries

Reference list

External links
Rugby.com.au profile

1998 births
Australian rugby union players
Australia international rugby union players
Australian sportspeople of Samoan descent
Living people
Rugby union centres
Canberra Vikings players
ACT Brumbies players